The women's association football tournament at the 2011 Pan American Games was held in Guadalajara, Mexico at the Omnilife Stadium from October 18 to October 27. Associations affiliated with FIFA that qualified were invited to send their full women's national teams.

For these Games, the women competed in an 8-team tournament, which is a drop from 10 at the 2007 games. The defending champions are Brazil, who won the title on home field.

Teams

Qualification
A National Olympic Committee may enter one women's team for the football competition. Mexico, the host nation and Canada (automatic qualification) along with six other countries qualified through regional competitions.

The highest finisher from each the Caribbean and Central American regions qualified.

Squads

The women's tournament is a full international tournament with no restrictions on age.  Each nation must submit a squad of 18 players September 2011. A minimum of two goalkeepers (plus one optional alternate goalkeeper) must be included in the squad.

Format
 Eight teams are split into 2 preliminary round groups of 4 teams each. The top 2 teams from each group qualify for the knockout stage.
 The third and fourth placed teams are eliminated from the competition.
 In the semifinals, the matchups are as follows: A1 vs. B2 and B1 vs. A2
 The winning teams from the semifinals play for the gold medal. The losing teams compete for the bronze medal.

Draw
The draw for the tournament was held at the offices of CONCACAF in New York City, United States. The draw was conducted by CONCACAF Deputy General Secretary Ted Howard. The seeding information was not provided, rather the results of the draw were given.

Team (World ranking as of July 2011)

Preliminary round
All times are local Central Daylight Time (UTC−5)

Group A

Group B

 

A drawing of lots was used to separate Canada and Brazil after they were tied on every tiebreaker. Brazil won the draw.

Knockout stage

Semifinals

Bronze-medal match

Gold-medal match

Goalscorers 
2 goals

 Shirley Cruz
 Christine Sinclair
 Christina Julien
 Débora de Oliveira
 Thais Guedes

1 goals

 Daniele Batista
 Maurine
 Maribel Domínguez
 Verónica Pérez
 Jennifer Ruiz  
 Wendy Acosta
 Raquel Rodríguez
 Katherine Alvarado
 Kaylyn Kyle
 Robyn Gayle
 Amelia Pietrangelo
 Lady Andrade
 Yoreli Rincón
 Catalina Usme
 Maylee Attin-Johnson
 Francisca Lara
 Francisca Mardones
 María José Rojas
 Mercedes Pereyra 
 Fabiana Vallejos 

1 own goal
 Marianne Ugalde (playing against Argentina)

Medalists

Final standings

References

2011
Football at the 2011 Pan American Games
Pan